Veera Puran Appu is a 1978 Sri Lankan Sinhala epic biographical film directed by Lester James Peries and produced by former cabinet minister Tyronne Fernando for Shalanka Films. It stars Ravindra Randeniya and Joe Abeywickrama in lead roles along with Malani Fonseka and Tissa Abeysekara. Music composed by Premasiri Khemadasa. It is the 399th Sri Lankan film in the Sinhala cinema.

The film screened in 17 cinemas in the fifth board. The film completed box office 100 days at the Webley Cinema Hall, Kandy. In the film, it is noted that more than 1,500 actors contributed to the success of the film. In 1979 SIGNIS Awards ceremony, Tissa Abeysekara was awarded the memorial award for his role as Kudapola Thero.

Plot
The film centered around the story behind national patriot Veera Puran Appu and his Matale rebellion in 1848 for the freedom from British. Though he was executed by the British by firing squad, his influence to the country's independence has been highly praised and thus Puran Appu is highlighted as a national hero of the Sri Lankan history.

Cast
 Ravindra Randeniya as Puran Appu 'Franciscu Fernando'
 Malini Fonseka as Bandara Menike 
 Tissa Abeysekera as Ven. Kudapola Sri Rahula Thero 
 Joe Abeywickrama as Gongalegoda Banda 'King David'
 Sriyani Amarasena as Kuda Manike 'Kumarihamy'
 Dharmasiri Bandaranayake as Punchi Rala
 Robin Fernando as Hanguranketha Dingirala
 David Dharmakeerthi as Gunnepana Arachchi
 Somasiri Dehipitiya as Puran Appu's brother
 Basil de Seram as British gunman
 Jean-Pierre Hautin as Captain Neville Watson
 Alfred Berry as Government Agent Bullen
 John Burgess as Governor Torrington
 David Thackeray as Sir Emerson Tennent
 Elson Divithurugama as Village crier
 Vincent Vaas as Cruel Master
 Cletus Mendis as one of Puran Appu's soldiers
 Buddhadasa Vithanarachchi as Rebel
 Wilson Karunaratne as Rebel
 Granville Rodrigo as Rebel
 B. S. Perera

Songs

References

1978 films
1970s Sinhala-language films